Edward Boughton may refer to:

Edward Boughton (MP), in 1584, MP for Coventry (UK Parliament constituency)
Sir Edward Boughton, 2nd Baronet (1628–1680) of the Boughton Baronets
Sir Edward Boughton, 5th Baronet (1689–1722) of the Boughton Baronets
Sir Edward Boughton, 6th Baronet (1719–1772) of the Boughton Baronets
Sir Edward Boughton, 8th Baronet (1742–1794) of the Boughton Baronets
Sir Edward Hotham Rouse Boughton, 5th and 13th Baronet (1893–1963) of the Boughton Baronets

See also

Boughton (surname)